PAM Brink Stadium is a multi-use stadium in Springs, South Africa. It has been closed for years due to damage caused by vandalism and financial problems. It was used mostly for football matches. It was the home ground of Benoni Premier United and has long been the lair of the Eastern Transvaal rugby team who plays in the Currie Cup first division. The stadium holds 25,000 people. It takes its name from P.A.M. Brink, who was president of the "sub-federation" of rugby in the Eastern Transvaal (before it became detached from the Transvaal in 1947), and mayor of the town of Springs.

It was inaugurated on 3 July 1949, during a game between Eastern Transvaal and the New Zealand All Blacks won by Eastern Transvaal, 6–5.
In 1962, Eastern Transvaal recorded another famous victory over a touring test team, this time defeating the British & Irish Lions, 19–16.

Two test matches have been played at the ground. In 1964, during their tour of South Africa, France defeated the Springboks, 8–6, in front of over 56,000 spectators, with many fans having to remain outside the stadium. The stadium had to wait almost forty years for its next test match in 2002, with victory for the Springboks against Argentina by 49–29.

Since 2006 the stadium has not been in use, it is believed because of finances this has contributed towards its downfall. The stadium has been very badly vandalized and is now illegally a home for homeless people.

References

Soccer venues in South Africa
Sports venues in Gauteng
Multi-purpose stadiums in South Africa
Rugby union stadiums in South Africa
Springs, Gauteng